William C. "Bill" Andrews (born January 24, 1934) is an American former politician in the state of Florida.

Andrews was born in Tampa, Florida. He attended the University of Florida's Warrington College of Business Administration, receiving a degree in business administration in 1955. He later attended the University of Florida Law School and earned a Bachelor of Laws (LLB) degree in 1958. In college, he was a member of Sigma Alpha Epsilon. He married Dodie Platt and has three children. Andrews served as a Democrat in the Florida House of Representatives from 1967 to November 7, 1972, representing the 31st district, and from November 7, 1972, to November 7, 1978, this time representing the 27th district. In 1978, he received a Distinguished Alumni Award from the Warrington College of Business Administration.

References

Living people
1934 births
Democratic Party members of the Florida House of Representatives
Warrington College of Business alumni